Jeremiah Cummings may refer to:

Jeremiah Williams Cummings, Roman Catholic priest in the 19th century
Jeremiah Cummings (minister), minister previously also a member of the band Harold Melvin & the Blue Notes